Celedonio Espinosa Jr. is an Olympian, a Filipino boxer who competed in the 1954 Asian Games in Manila and took home the gold medal. He represented the Philippines in the 1956 Summer Olympics in Melbourne, Australia  and bagged the bronze medal in the 1958 Asian Games staged in Tokyo, Japan.

He once assumed the post of the Far Eastern University Boxing Team and also became a boxing coach, referee and judge.

References

Boxers at the 1956 Summer Olympics
Living people
People from Rizal
Olympic boxers of the Philippines
Year of birth missing (living people)
Asian Games medalists in boxing
Boxers at the 1954 Asian Games
Boxers at the 1958 Asian Games
Asian Games gold medalists for the Philippines
Asian Games bronze medalists for the Philippines
Medalists at the 1954 Asian Games
Medalists at the 1958 Asian Games
Filipino male boxers
Lightweight boxers